20th Century Masters – The Millennium Collection: The Best of L.A. Guns is an L.A. Guns compilation album. Unlike previous compilation albums by the band (with the exception of Best Of: Hollywood a Go-Go), 20th Century Masters consists of the actual original recordings, not newly recorded versions of the band's hits.

Track listing
"Sex Action"
"One More Reason"
"Electric Gypsy"
"Rip & Tear"
"Never Enough"
"The Ballad of Jayne"
"Over the Edge"
"Kiss My Love Goodbye"
"Crystal Eyes"
"It's Over Now"
"Face Down"
"Long Time Dead"

References

L.A. Guns
Albums produced by John Purdell
Albums produced by Tom Werman
Albums produced by Duane Baron
L.A. Guns compilation albums
2005 greatest hits albums
Polydor Records compilation albums